The Order of the Lion is the name of a number of decorations issued by several monarchies and republics, and may refer to:

Europe
 Order of the Lion of Finland
 Order of the Netherlands Lion
 Order of the Norwegian Lion
 Royal Order of the Lion, Kingdom of Belgium
 Order of the Lion (France)
 Order of the White Lion, Czech Republic
 Order of the Zähringer Lion, (Baden)
 Order of the Gold Lion of the House of Nassau
 House Order of the Golden Lion (Hesse-Kassel)
 Order of the Lion of Bavaria

Africa
National Order of the Lion, Senegal
Order of the Lion (Malawi)
 Royal Order of the Lion of Godenu, Ghana

Other places
 Order of the Lion and the Sun, Persia

See also
 Military Order of the White Lion, Czechoslovakia
 Order of Henry the Lion, Duchy of Brunswick, present-day Germany
 Order of Menelik II, sometimes referred to as the Order of the Lion, Ethiopia
 Order of the Red Lion and the Sun, Iran
 Order of St Philip of the Lion of Limburg